Fulda is a genus of skippers in the family Hesperiidae.  All species of this genus are known only from Madagascar.

Species
Fulda australis Viette, 1956
Fulda bernieri (Boisduval, 1833)
Fulda coroller (Boisduval, 1833)
Fulda gatiana (Oberthür, 1923)
Fulda imorina Evans, 1937
Fulda lucida Evans, 1937
Fulda pauliani Evans, 1952
Fulda rhadama (Boisduval, 1833)

References

External links
Natural History Museum Lepidoptera genus database

Astictopterini
Hesperiidae genera